The 2011–12 Argentine Torneo Argentino A was the seventeenth season of third division professional football in Argentina. A total of 25 teams competed; the champion was promoted to Primera B Nacional.

Club information

North Zone

South Zone

1 Play their home games at Estadio José María Minella.

First stage

North Zone

South Zone

Second stage

Reválida Stage

Zone A

Unión de Sunchales and Alumni de Villa María were ineligible for the Second Round because they were involved in relegation.

Overall standings
The overall standings for the seven teams of Zone A include the regular season and the first round of the Reválida. The bottom team relegates to the Torneo Argentino B, while the next-to-last team plays the relegation play-off with a team from such category. Those two teams cannot qualify for the second round of the Reválida.

Zone B

CAI was ineligible for the Second Round, as it was involved in relegation.

Overall standings
The overall standings for the seven teams of Zone B include the regular season and the first round of the Reválida. The bottom team relegates to the Torneo Argentino B, while the next-to-last team plays the relegation play-off with a team from such category. Those two teams cannot qualify for the second round of the Reválida.

Second round

Semifinals

Third stage
The Third Stage includes the two teams qualified from the Second Stage of the Reválida, plus the six teams directly qualified to the Third Stage of the Reválida from the Second Stage of the regular season.

Fourth stage
The Fourth Stage is played by the four winners of the Third Stage of the Reválida, plus the four teams that qualified directly to the Fourth Stage of the Reválida from the Second Stage of the regular season.

Fifth stage
The Fifth Stage is played by the four winners of the Fourth Stage.

Sixth stage
The Sixth Stage is played by the two winners of the Fifth Stage.

Promotion/relegation playoff Torneo Argentino A-B Nacional

Crucero del Norte was promoted to 2012–13 Primera B Nacional by winning the playoff and Guillermo Brown was relegated to 2012–13 Torneo Argentino A

Promotion/relegation playoffs Torneo Argentino A-Torneo Argentino B

Alumni remained in the Torneo Argentino A by drawing the playoff.
San Jorge (T) was promoted to 2012–13 Torneo Argentino A by winning the playoff and CAI was relegated to 2012–13 Torneo Argentino B

See also
2011–12 in Argentine football

References

3
Torneo Argentino A seasons